Oncerini is a tribe of May beetles and junebugs in the family Scarabaeidae. There are at least two genera and two described species in Oncerini.

Genera
These two genera belong to the tribe Oncerini:
 Nefoncerus Saylor, 1938
 Oncerus LeConte, 1856

References

Further reading

 
 
 
 
 
 

Melolonthinae
Articles created by Qbugbot